Sanharó is a city located in the state of Pernambuco, Brazil. Located  at 198 km away from Recife, capital of the state of Pernambuco. Has an estimated (IBGE 2020) population of 26,890 inhabitants.

Geography
 State - Pernambuco
 Region - Agreste Pernambucano
 Boundaries - Belo Jardim   (N and E);  São Bento do Una    (S);  Pesqueira   (W)
 Area - 256.18 km2
 Elevation - 653 m
 Hydrography - Capibaribe and Ipojuca rivers
 Vegetation - Caatinga Hipoxerófila
 Climate - Semi arid - hot
 Annual average temperature - 22.3 c
 Distance to Recife - 198 km

Economy
The main economic activities in Sanharó are based in industry and agribusiness, especially manioc, beans; and livestock such as cattle, pigs, sheep, goats and poultry.

Economic indicators

Economy by Sector
2006

Health indicators

References

Municipalities in Pernambuco